Musigati is a commune of Bubanza Province in north-western Burundi. The capital lies at Musigati city.

Communes of Burundi
Bubanza Province